Flos apidanus, the plain plushblue, is a small butterfly found in the Indomalayan realm that belongs to the lycaenids or blues family. The species was first described by Pieter Cramer in 1777.

Subspecies
F. a. apidanus Java, Bali, Lombok, Sumbawa, Tanahdjampea, Tambora
F. a. ahamus Doherty, 1891 Assam, central Myanmar, southern Myanmar, Mergui, Thailand, Langkawi
F. a. saturatus (Snellen, 1890) Peninsular Malaya, Sumatra, Bangka, Borneo, Belitung
F. a. xisuthrus (Fruhstorfer, 1914) Nias
F. a. arahat (Fruhstorfer, 1914) Bawean
F. a. phalakron (Fruhstorfer, 1914) Northeast Sumatra
F. a. himna (Fruhstorfer, 1914) Philippines (Mindanao)
F. a. palawanus (Staudinger, 1889) Palawan, Sulawesi

Range in India
The butterfly is found in India from Assam (Cachar) to Karens (Myanmar) and from Dawnas to southern Myanmar.

Status
In 1932, William Harry Evans reported that the species was rare.

See also
List of butterflies of India (Lycaenidae)

Cited references

References
 
 
 

Flos
Butterflies of Asia